Kuala Lumpur General Post Office is the biggest general post office in Malaysia. Located at Dayabumi Complex, operations began in 1985. It is managed by Pos Malaysia.

Transportation
The post office is accessible within walking distance north west of Pasar Seni LRT Station.

Post office buildings
Buildings and structures in Kuala Lumpur
Postal system of Malaysia